Literature and Theology is a quarterly peer-reviewed indisciplinary academic journal of theology and literary studies published by Oxford University Press. It "provides a critical non-confessional forum for both textual analysis and theoretical speculation, encouraging explorations of how religion is embedded in culture". It is one of the foremost journals in the field of religion and literature, and has a rich history of publishing original theoretical, philosophical, literary, and theological interdisciplinary research. The current editorial board headed by Professor Mark Knight (Lancaster University) includes several leading names in the academic field of religion and literature, including Dr Jo Carruthers (Lancaster University), Professor Emma Mason (University of Warwick), Dr Elizabeth Anderson (University of Aberdeen), Professor Richard Rosengarten (University of Chicago), Professor Alana Vincent (University of Chester), Professor Linn Tonstad (Yale) and Professor Gerard Loughlin (University of Durham).

The Advisory Board comprises a similarly stellar group of academics who have shaped the now popular study of religion and literature, including Professor Kevin Hart (University of Virginia), Dr Andrew Hass (University of Stirling), Professor Elisabeth Jay (Oxford Brookes University), Professor Jeff Keuss (Seattle Pacific University), Professor Julia Rienhard Lupton (University of California, Irvine), Professor David Jasper (University of Glasgow), Professor Heather Walton (University of Glasgow), and Professor Eric Ziolkowski (Lafayette College).

The journal is abstracted and indexed in the Annual Bibliography of English Language and Literature, the British Humanities Index, IBZ Internationale Bibliographie der Geistes und Sozialwissenschaftlichen Zeitschriftenliteratur, the International Review of Biblical Studies, MLA International Bibliography, the ATLA Religion Database, Religious & Theological Abstracts, several ProQuest databases, and elsewhere.

References

External links 
 

Religious studies journals
Literary magazines published in the United Kingdom
English-language journals
Quarterly journals
Oxford University Press academic journals
Publications established in 1987